Echeta grandis is a moth of the family Erebidae. It was described by Herbert Druce in 1883. It is found in Ecuador.

References

Phaegopterina
Moths described in 1883